Alonso Manuel Escalante (24 December 1906 – 14 June 1967) was a Roman Catholic prelate and missionary, venerated by those he touched as the "Vagabond of God." He was born in Mérida, Yucatan, Mexico in 1906 and traveled to the U.S. where he was ordained a priest as a member of the Maryknoll Missionaries. 

Bishop Alonso Manuel Escalante was instrumental in the foundation of the Missionaries of Guadalupe, who in turn, made possible the creation of the Intercontinental University. He later became Apostolic Vicar of Pando in Bolivia. He received his Episcopal Ordination in the Old Basilica of Our Lady of Guadalupe, where he was invited, with the consent of Pius XII, to return to Mexico to found and be Rector of the Mexican Seminary of Missions in October 1949. The Holy See appointed him National Director of the Works Pontifical of the Propagation of the Faith and of San Pedro Apóstol, a position he carried out until its death, on 21 June 1967 in Hong Kong.

The Vagabond of God
"The life of a missionary can be compared to that of a vagabond with notable differences. A vagabond does not know where he is going or cares, while a missionary does know where he is going and does care. He walks for himself, he walks for God. Both feel the itching to keep walking. In short: a vagabond has the urge to walk, eat and drink; a missionary has the mandate to walk, teach and baptize. Is it not right that we call ourselves the 'vagabonds of God?'"

- Mons. Alonso Manuel Escal

Biography
Bishop Alonso Manuel Escalante was born in Mérida, Yucatán, Mexico, in 1906. He emigrated to the U.S. when he was nine years old. When he was fourteen, he entered a Maryknoll high school seminary, and finished his studies in 1931, being ordained on 2 February 1931. He then would “give back” by teaching for a year in the Maryknoll Venard Seminary. His desire to be a missionary to China was fulfilled the next year, when he was assigned to the mission in Fushin, where he served for eight years, as war loomed in the background.

He was brought back to the U.S. as a professor in Maryknoll seminary in 1940. In the meantime, Maryknoll was asked by Rome to establish a vicariate in the Amazon area of Bolivia. Escalante led the first group of 17 Maryknollers to the Pando in Bolivia. In 1942, the Vatican named him the Vicar Apostolic of the Pando, and the following year, he was ordained a bishop.

Six years later, in 1948, the bishops of Mexico asked Maryknoll for Bishop Escalante's help in their development of their own foreign mission society, which Bishop Escalante accepted. With his academic background, he became the first rector of their “Mexican Society for Foreign Missions (SMME)”, later to be known as the “Guadalupe Fathers”.

Bishop Escalante served the rest of his career in service to the Guadalupe Fathers, and went to Hong Kong in 1967 to help in securing mission territory for them. While this mission was later realized, he took seriously ill while in Hong Kong, and died on 21 June of that year. He asked to have a funeral at Maryknoll headquarters in Ossining, New York, and to be buried in his beloved Mexico. He is remembered well on both sides of the border as being a symbol of missionary spirit, and as personifying the friendship between both countries.

References

1906 births
1967 deaths
People from Mérida, Yucatán
Mexican Roman Catholic missionaries
Mexican emigrants to the United States
Roman Catholic missionaries in China
Roman Catholic missionaries in Bolivia
Roman Catholic bishops of Pando